The second season of the Colombian television series The Queen of Flow, aired in Colombia on Caracol Televisión from 26 April 2021 to 10 September 2021. The season follows Yeimy Montoya (Carolina Ramírez), who after achieving fame and success in music she decides to give herself a chance in love with Juancho Mesa (Andrés Sandoval), not knowing that soon in her life, an enemy who knows her and all her loved ones very well. Meanwhile, Carlos Cruz/Charly Flow (Carlos Torres) makes merits to get out of prison.

The season was ordered in October 2018 and production started in January 2020. Subsequently, it had to be postponed due to several cases of coronavirus as a result of the COVID-19 pandemic in Colombia and activities were resumed in October of that same year.

Cast 
 Carolina Ramírez as Yeimy Montoya
 Carlos Torres as Carlos Cruz "Charly Flow"
 Andrés Sandoval as Juan Camilo Mesa "Juancho"
 Adriana Arango as Ligia de Cruz
 Lucho Velasco as Dúver Cruz "Manín"
 Juan Manuel Restrepo as Erik "Mateo" Cruz Montoya 'Pez Koi'
 Mariana Gomez as Irma "El Huracán"
 Marcelo Dos Santos as Mike Rivera
 Juan Palau as Drama Key
 Diana Wiswell as Catalina Bedoya
 Pedro Roda as José Serna
 Luna Baxter as Silvia Duarte
 Pedro Ochoa as Búho
 Mariana Garzón as Vanessa Cruz Granados
 Erik Rodríguez as Titano
 Sebastián Silva as Alberto Espitia "Pite"
 Carlos Fernández as Ángel Botero
 Pedro Suárez as Caronte
 Ángel David Giraldo as Emilio
 Kevin Buri as Cris Vega
 Kiño as Axel
 Camila Taborda as Zafiro

Episodes

References 

Television productions suspended due to the COVID-19 pandemic